Milton Fonseca Pelissari (born 25 February 1971) is a Brazilian former handball player. He competed at the 1992 Summer Olympics and the 1996 Summer Olympics.

References

External links
 

1971 births
Living people
Brazilian male handball players
Olympic handball players of Brazil
Handball players at the 1992 Summer Olympics
Handball players at the 1996 Summer Olympics
People from Santa Maria, Rio Grande do Sul
Sportspeople from Rio Grande do Sul
Pan American Games medalists in handball
Pan American Games silver medalists for Brazil
Medalists at the 1995 Pan American Games
Medalists at the 1999 Pan American Games
Handball players at the 1999 Pan American Games
20th-century Brazilian people